Osmangazi station is a station on the Marmaray commuter rail line in Gebze, Turkey. It was previously a station on the Haydarpaşa suburban until 2013, when commuter rail service was suspended. The original station was opened in 1954 with two side platforms and demolished in 2013. Construction of the new station started shortly after and was structurally completed in 2014, along with the other eight stations located between Pendik and Gebze. Commuter rail service resumed on 13 March 2019.

The station has two tracks with an island platform and one express track on the south side for high-speed and intercity trains.

References

Railway stations in Kocaeli Province
Gebze
Railway stations opened in 1954
Railway stations opened in 2019